Kuh Zin (also Romanized as Kūh Zīn; also known as Gazīn, Gozīn, Kezan, and Kizin) is a village in Sain Qaleh Rural District, in the Central District of Abhar County, Zanjan Province, Iran. At the 2006 census, its population was 402, in 99 families.

References 

Populated places in Abhar County